Rayalaseema Ramanna Chowdary is a 2000 Telugu film directed by Suresh Krissna. The film stars Mohan Babu, Jayasudha, Priya Gill and Chandra Mohan.

Cast
Mohan Babu as in a dual role as Rayalaseema Ramanna Chowdary / Murali
Jayasudha as Seetha, Ramanna's wife
Tarun master as Bhikshupathi, Ramanna Chowdhary's cousin brother
Priya Gill as Murali's lover and wife
Prema as Naga Sulochana
Chandra Mohan as Venkata Sastry "Venkanna"
Achyuth as Murali's brother, Ramanna's  Younger son
Jaya Prakash Reddy as Sambasiva Rao
Narra Venkateswara Rao as Subbarayudu
Ranganath as Siva Rama Krishnayya, Ramanna's father
Giri Babu as Jagannadham, Siva Rama Krishnayya's brother
Rallapalli as Lokeswara Rao
Napoleon as Jatadhara Swamiji
Brahmanandam as Annavaram, Murali's servant
Kovai Sarala as Venkamma, Annavaram's wife

Production 
The story was reportedly given to Suresh Krissna by Rajinikanth. Tarun worked as the choreographer and villain for the film. The film was shot at Pollachi.

Soundtrack 

The music was composed by Mani Sharma and released by Aditya Music.

Awards
Kovai Sarala won the Nandi Award for Best Female Comedian

References

External links 
Review on Full Hyderabad

2000 films
Films directed by Suresh Krissna
2000s Telugu-language films
Films scored by Mani Sharma